The New Zealand Cycle Classic  (previously known as the Tour of Wellington) is a road cycling race held in and around the Wairarapa near Wellington, New Zealand. The race is a men's competition over five stages and part of the UCI Oceania Tour.

Multiple victories

Winners

Most stage wins
Most stage wins by riders
Listed are those riders with more than 3 stage wins

Stage wins by each country

References

 Results

External links
New Zealand Cycle Classic

Cycle races in New Zealand
UCI Oceania Tour races
Recurring sporting events established in 1988
1988 establishments in New Zealand
Summer events in New Zealand